West Africa Democracy Radio (WADR) is a trans-territorial, sub-regional broadcaster based in Dakar, Senegal. WADR is a project of the Open Society Initiative for West Africa (OSIWA) set up in 2003 to protect and defend the ideals of democratic and open societies by disseminating development information through a network of community radios in the West African sub-region.

The WADR network comprises nearly 40 partner radios in eight West African countries and a chain of correspondents in ten countries in the region. WADR broadcasts in French and English on 94.9 FM in Dakar, via satellite on Astra 4A to sub-Saharan Africa, and streams to the African diaspora from its website.

In April 2011, Sourcefabric worked with West Africa Democracy Radio to build a news platform for the station using Airtime, Newscoop and SoundCloud integration. The project was named as a special distinction winner in the 2011 Knight-Batten Awards for Innovations in Journalism which identify projects developing interactive journalism.

See also
List of radio stations in Senegal

References

External links
 

Mass media in Dakar
Radio stations in Senegal
International radio networks
Internet radio stations